Tsaghkadzor is a spa town and urban municipal community, as well as one of the most popular health resorts in Armenia, located north of the capital Yerevan in the Kotayk Province. According to the 2011 census, the town has a population of 1,256, down from 3,350 reported in the 1989 census. Currently, the town has an approximate population of 900 as per the 2016 official estimate.

Etymology 
Tsaghkadzor literally means valley of flowers or flower canyon in Armenian. The name of Tsaghkadzor is associated with the name of the nearby Tsaghkunyats Mountains, located to the west of the town.

Originally, it was known as Tsaghkunyats Dzor (Ծաղկունյաց ձոր) by its foundation during the 3rd century. In the 11th century, the town was known as Kecharuyk (Կեչառույք), or Kecharis, derived from the Kecharis Principality under the Armenian Pahlavuni family. Later, during the 17th century, the town was called Darachichak by the Turkic invaders, keeping the name until 1947, when it was renamed Tsaghkadzor.

History

Ancient history and Middle Ages 
Historically, the territory of modern-day Tsaghkadzor is associated with the Varazhnunik canton of Ayrarat province of Ancient Armenia.

Tsaghkadzor was first mentioned as Tsaghkunyats Dzor during the 3rd century when it was formed as a small settlement and quickly became the most favourite hunting ground for the Arsacid kings of Armenia. During the 4th and 5th centuries, Tsaghkunyats Dzor along the surrounding lands and forests was placed under the governance of the Varazhnuni noble family by the Arsacid kings. Later between the 5th and 7th centuries, the region was granted to the Kamsarakan and Amatuni families, under the Persian rule. Between the 7th and 9th centuries, Armenia suffered from the Arab Islamic occupation.

In the 9th century, Tsaghkunyats Dzor became part of the Bagratid Kingdom of Armenia established in 885. Starting from the 10th century, the houses of Kamsarakan and Pahlavuni—both related with the Arsacid dynasty by origins—were merged and governed the cantons of Aragatsotn, Kotayk and Varazhnunik. Prince Grigor Magistros of the Pahlavuni family became the head of the Kecharis Principality and built the Kecharis Monastery in 1033, in honor of Gregory the Illuminator. In 1051, he also built the Surp Nshan Church (Holy Sign Church). During this period, the town was known as Kecharuyk.

In the mid-11th century, the region suffered from the Seljuk invasion led by Tughril and later by his successor Alp Arslan. However, with the establishment of the Zakarid Principality of Armenia in 1201 under the Georgian protectorate, Kecharuyk witnessed a significant rise in the economic and cultural life under the rule of the Khaghbakyan and later by the Proshyan noble families, during the 13th and the 14th centuries. After the Mongols captured Ani in 1236, Armenia turned into a Mongol protectorate as part of the Ilkhanate, and the Zakarids became vassals to the Mongols. After the fall of the Ilkhanate in the mid-14th century, the Zakarid princes ruled over Lori, Shirak, Kotayk, and Ararat plain until 1360 when they fell to the invading Turkic tribes.

16th to 19th centuries 

At the beginning of the 16th century, Kecharuyk became part of the Erivan Beglarbegi within the Safavid Persia. The town of Kecharuyk became known as Darachichak under the Persian rule. During the first half of the 18th century, Darachichak became part of the Erivan Khanate under the rule of the Afsharid dynasty and later under the Qajar dynasty of Persia. It remained under the Persian rule until 1827–28, when Eastern Armenia was ceded by the Russian Empire as a result of the Russo-Persian War of 1826–28 and the signing of the Treaty of Turkmenchay.

Modern history 
With the fall of the Russian Empire and after the decisive Armenian victory over the Turks in the battles of Sardarabad, Abaran, and Gharakilisa, the entire region of Kotayk became part of the independent Armenia in May 1918.

After 2 years of brief independence, Armenia became part of the Soviet Union in December 1920. In 1930, Darachichak was included in the newly formed Akhta raion (later renamed Hrazdan raion in 1959). In 1947 the village of Darachichak was renamed Tsaghkadzor. In 1958, it was incorporated into an urban-type settlement.

During the Soviet era, Tsaghkadzor has been developed as a major spa town and health resort, intending to attract a large number of tourists. Many monumental buildings and dachas previously built by the wealthy merchants of Yerevan and Tiflis, were either nationalized in favour of the state or sold in auctions. In 1958, it was given the status of an urban-type settlement. In 1959, it became part of the Hrazdan raion. Later in 1984, Tsaghkadzor was given the status of a town.

After the independence of Armenia, Tsaghkadzor entered a new era of redevelopment starting from 2000. With the foundation of many luxurious hotels and sanatoriums, the town became a major winter resort attracting a large number of ski and snowboard enthusiasts from all over the world, to become one of the most developed touristic destinations in Armenia.

On 11 August 2008, around 90 American Peace Corps volunteers, trainees and staff members were relocated to Tsaghkadzor from the Republic of Georgia as a precaution during the military conflict with Russia.

Geography 

Tsaghkadzor is located 50 kilometers north of the capital Yerevan and 3 kilometers east of the provincial centre Hrazdan. Surrounded with alpine meadows, the town is situated on the southeastern slope of Mount Teghenis, at a height of 1841 meters above sea level. Tsaghkadzor is surrounded by the Tsaghkunyats mountain range from the west, and the town of Hrazdan from the east.

Summers in Tsaghkadzor are characterized with mild climate, while winters are cold and snowy.

Demographics

Culture 

Tsaghkadzor has a cultural palace and a public library. The day of Tsaghkadzor is celebrated annually on October 3.

The Kecharis Monastery is one of the significant religious complexes of Eastern Armenia and one of the well-preserved medieval architectural samples of the Armenian Highland. It was founded at the beginning of the 11th century, consisted of 4 separate adjacent churches. The main church of the complex is the Saint Gregory Church built in 1033. The church of Surp Nshan built in 1051, is located to the south of Saint Gregory Church. The Katoghike Church built at the beginning of the 13th century, stands to the south of Surp Nshan Church. The fourth church of the complex is the Church of Surp Harutyun of 1220.

The house-museum of the brothers Orbeli, is dedicated to the Armenian scientists Ruben, Levon and Joseph Orbeli who were native of Tsaghkadzor. Professor Ruben Orbeli was the founder of marine archaeology and one of the major specialists of ocean engineering. Physiologist Levon Orbeli was a prominent member of the USSR and Armenian SSR academies of science. Scientist Joseph Orbeli was an orientalist specialized in medieval history of South Caucasus. He administered the Hermitage Museum of Saint Petersburg between 1934 and 1951.

Transportation 
Tsaghkadzor is accessible through the H-5 Road from the southeast, as well as the H-28 Road from the northwest. The H-29 Road connects the town with Gegharkunik and northeastern Armenia, via the town of Hrazdan. Public transport to Tsaghkadzor is available from Hrazdan city and leaves from Micro District hourly until 19:30. Multiple private cabs are also available upon request. The regular price from Hrazdan to Tsaghkadzor is AMD 1,000 (approximately 2 dollars).

Economy and tourism 

The infrastructure of tourism is highly developed in Tsaghkadzor, with many luxurious hotels, resorts and amusement facilities.

Tsaghkadzor ski resort is located just above the town, at a height of 1,750 meters above sea level. It was fully modernized during the first decade of the 21st century. All of the cableway lifts are manufactured and operated by the Leitner Group. The current structure replaced the old soviet-era lifts, mostly following their path. There were initially 3 consecutive lifts stretching from the foot of the mountain at a height of 1969 meters above sea level, up till the mountain peak at 2,819 meters high, with the first and second lifts ending at 2,234 meters and 2,465 meters high, respectively. In 2006 a fourth lift was added, stretching from the end of the first stage towards an opposite hilltop, thus adding two trails, both leading down to the foot of the slopes. Apart from the lifts the resort offers ski and snowboard rental as well as skiing instructors. The skiing season in Tsaghkadzor normally starts in mid-December and stretches well into March with the top slopes often fit for skiing in April.

Tsaghkadzor is the second Armenian city after Yerevan to have the largest number of hotels. Many luxury hotels and resorts were opened recently to serve the town during the summer and winter seasons, including the Marriott Tsaghkadzor Hotel, Multi Rest House Hotel, Golden Palace Resort and Spa, Ararat Resort Tsaghkadzor, Best Western Alva Hotel and Spa, and the Tsaghkadzor General Sports Complex Hotel.

Tsaghkadzor is among the 3 towns of Armenia that are allowed to accommodate gambling houses and activities within urban area (along with Jermuk and Sevan). The town's "Golden Palace Senator" and "Senator Royale" are among the most prominent casinos of Armenia.

Education 
With the diminished number of the town's population, currently Tsaghkadzor is home to 1 public education school.

The Yerevan State University has a guesthouse in Tsaghkadzor.

Sport 

Tsaghkadzor is a major sports center for Armenia. The Tsaghkadzor Olympic Sports Complex was opened in 1967 through the efforts of the Olympic champion Hrant Shahinyan, specifically to host the preparation of the Soviet athletes for the 1968 Summer Olympics in Mexico City. Entirely renovated and reopened 2008, it is considered one of the most developed training facilities in Transcaucasia, with its modernized hotel and sanatorium.

The Tsaghkadzor ski resort operating since 1986, is the centre of winter sports in Armenia. The skiing season in Tsaghkadzor normally starts in mid-December and stretches well into March with the top slopes often fit for skiing in April.

Tsaghkadzor hosted the 2015 FIDE World Team Chess Championship between 18 and 29 April 2015.

The Olympic complex hosts the annual competition of the "Best Sport Family" held every year during summer.

Notable people 
 Vetsik Vardapet (12th century), medieval Armenian architect
 Khachatur Kecharetsi (1260–1331), medieval Armenian poet
 Leon Orbeli (1882–1958), Soviet-Armenian physiologist

Sister cities 
 Font-Romeu-Odeillo-Via, France

See also 
 Sport in Armenia

References

External links 

 VisitArm.com – All hotels in Tsaghkadzor
 Tsaghkadzor.com – Tsaghkadzor Travel Guide
 http://www.tsakhkadzor.am
 http://www.hyurservice.com/images/tours/tsaghkadzor.jpg
 http://www.hotels.am/Kotayk/kotayk_hotels.php
 Tsakhkadzor Ski Resort – Armenia's Undiscovered Winter Destination

Populated places in Kotayk Province
Ski areas and resorts in Armenia
Mountain resorts in Armenia
3rd-century establishments in Armenia